Salida (Spanish for exit) may refer to some places in the United States:

 Salida, California
 Salida, Colorado